A State of Mind is a 2004 documentary film directed by Daniel Gordon and produced by Nicholas Bonner. It follows two North Korean child gymnasts and their families for over eight months during training for the 2003 Pyongyang mass games. The film won two awards at the North Korean Pyongyang International Film Festival in 2004 and was shown at 11 other film festivals worldwide before being released in a theatrical run in 2005.

UK-based dance band Faithless used clips from the documentary for the video to the single "I Want More."

See also
 The Game of Their Lives (2002), a previous film by Daniel Gordon and Nicholas Bonner about North Korean athletes
 Crossing the Line (2006), their most recent film about Joe Dresnok, an American who defected to North Korea in 1962

References

External links
 

2004 films
British independent films
British sports documentary films
Films set in North Korea
2000s Korean-language films
Documentary films about North Korea
2004 documentary films
Films produced by John Battsek
2004 independent films
2000s English-language films
2000s British films